Karl Bryson (born 20 March 1989) is a New Zealand rugby union player who last played for  in the National Provincial Championship. His position of choice is halfback.

Known by the nickname "Killer", Bryson plays his club rugby for College Old Boys in Palmerston North.

He made his provincial debut in 2010 and continued playing in the main squad until 2013. He has not played since, however Manawatu coach Jeremy Cotter has named Bryson in the Wider Training Squad for 2016.

Family 
Bryson's father, Jim, played either as a fullback or wing. He also represented Manawatu, where as a goalkicker he scored 128 points.

References 

New Zealand rugby union players
Manawatu rugby union players
Rugby union scrum-halves
1989 births
Living people